The Mandela Institute for Development Studies (MINDS) is an Africa-wide think tank which provides a forum for dialogue, information
dissemination, networking and research on the different elements of Africa. The institutions aims to shape policy and practice on governance, economic development and the evolution of African institutions. It seeks to address the short, medium, and long-term development challenges in Africa in a holistic and comprehensive manner. MINDS is a non-governmental organisation and is based in Johannesburg, South Africa.

History
MINDS was established in 2010 by former Vice President and Chief Operating Officer of the African Development Bank, Dr Nkosana Moyo

Programmes

MINDS programmes focus on four thematic areas, i.e. African Heritage, African Governance and Democracy, Economic Development and Institution Formation/Development. The institution commissions research that may lead to a better understanding of African Heritage to shape the nature of development programmes, lead in to better results relative to those achieved to date. The findings from the research undertaken and/or commissioned by MINDS will be used either as input into dialogues whose proceedings will be published. MINDS will also make existing knowledge more accessible through reviews and consolidation of that knowledge.
MINDS convenes dialogues based on the research findings. Dialogues hosted also serves the opportunity for knowledge dissemination, networking and influencing public policy formulation and practice in the thematic areas.

Youth Programmes

High Level Dialogue

African Heritage

Board of Trustees
Nkosana Moyo 
Graça Machel 
Ali Mufuruki 
Sara Menker

Advisory board
Donald Kaberuka 
Ngozi Okonjo-Iweala 
Francis Daniels 
Noureddine Ayed 
Adebayo Olukoshi 
Thandika Mkandawire 
Trevor Manuel

Patrons
Olusegun Obasanjo 
Pedro Pires 
Benjamin Mkapa 
Festus Mogae

Project partners and associates

Shoprite 
Old Mutual 
Trust Africa 
Southern Africa Trust 
Grace Machel Trust 
The African Capacity Building Foundation 
Nelson Mandela Foundation 
South African Airways 
Musa Capital

See also
List of charitable foundations

References

External links
Official website

Think tanks based in South Africa
Organisations based in Johannesburg
Think tanks established in 2010
2010 establishments in South Africa